Robert B. Satloff is an American writer and, since January 1993, the executive director of the Washington Institute for Near East Policy (WINEP). Satloff's expertise includes "U.S. policy, public diplomacy, Arab and Islamic politics, Arab-Israeli relations, U.S.-Israel relations, peace process, Middle East democratization." Satloff is also a member of the board of editors of the Middle East Quarterly, a publication of the Middle East Forum.

Early life
Robert Satloff graduated from Duke University, where he received a bachelor of arts degree. He received a master of arts degree from Harvard University and a PhD from St. Antony's College, Oxford.

Writing career
Satloff authored or edited nine books. His writing has appeared in major newspapers such as the New York Times, Wall Street Journal, Washington Post, and the Los Angeles Times.

In 2006, he wrote Among the Righteous: Lost Stories from the Holocaust's Long Reach into Arab Lands, which reported that there were Muslims and Arabs who rescued potential victims of the Nazi-directed programs related to the Holocaust as well as those who collaborated in those programs.

Satloff has also provided commentary for major television network news programs, talk shows, and National Public Radio. Satloff hosts a program on an Arab satellite channel: he is the creator and host of Dakhil Washington (Inside Washington), a weekly news and interview program on al-Hurra, the U.S. government-sponsored Arabic satellite television channel.

Personal life
Satloff lived in Chevy Chase, Maryland, with his wife, Jennie Litvack, an economist and horn player, and three sons, Benjamin, William and David.

Publications

Books
 Among the Righteous: Lost Stories from the Holocaust's Long Reach into Arab Lands (PublicAffairs, 2006). 
The Battle of Ideas in the War on Terror: Essays on U.S. Public Diplomacy in the Middle East (The Washington Institute, 2004).
 U.S. Policy toward Islamism (Council on Foreign Relations, 2000)
 From Abdullah to Hussein: Jordan in Transition (Oxford University Press, 1994)
 Troubles on the East Bank: Challenges to the Domestic Stability of Jordan (Praeger, 1986)

Articles and interviews
 Interviews with historian Robert Satloff, Fresh Air from WHYY-FM, December 14, 2006.
Hip, Hip, Al Hurra! Explaining America to the Arabs — with no help from the State Department. by Robert Satloff (Weekly Standard) November 6, 2006, Volume 012, Issue 08
Voices on Antisemitism Interview with Robert Satloff from the United States Holocaust Memorial Museum
A 'Righteous' Honor for an Arab Who Saved Jews, NPR Morning Edition, April 19, 2007

References

Further reading
Righteous Muslims. A briefing by Robert Satloff by Rachel Silverman, Jewish Exponent, December 14, 2006 (Middle East Forum, December 11, 2006)

External links

Official web page at Washington Institute

Living people
Jewish American writers
American Zionists
Islam and Judaism
The Washington Institute for Near East Policy
Duke University alumni
Harvard University alumni
Alumni of St Antony's College, Oxford
Year of birth missing (living people)
21st-century American Jews